Gaétan Huot is a Canadian film editor from Quebec.

For director François Girard, Huot edited the 1993 film Thirty Two Short Films About Glenn Gould, for which he won the Genie Award for Best Editing. By 1994, he had a shop in Montreal, where he mentored novice editor Yvann Thibodeau.  In 1997, Huot was nominated for a Genie Award again for editing Karmina.

Huot was among the Thirty Two Short Films About Glenn Gould crew who reunited with Girard for the 1998 film The Red Violin. For The Red Violin, he won for Best Editing at the 1st Jutra Awards.

References

External links
Gaétan Huot at the Internet Movie Database

Best Editing Genie and Canadian Screen Award winners
Canadian film editors
Living people
Year of birth missing (living people)